Mozaffarabad (also Romanized as Moz̧affarābād) is a village in Rivand Rural District, in the Central District of Nishapur County, Razavi Khorasan Province, Iran. At the 2006 census, its population was 144, in 43 families.

References 

Populated places in Nishapur County